This is an incomplete list of video games developed in the Czech Republic, both released and upcoming.

Games developed in the Czech Republic

References

External links 
Database of Czech and Slovak video games
Czech and Slovak video game database
List of commercial Czech and Slovak PC Games with added information

Czech Republic
Czech entertainment-related lists